St. Nicholas Cathedral is the main church of the Kuopio Orthodox Parish in Väinölänniemi, Kuopio, Finland, and also the seat of the Orthodox Diocese of Karelia. The church was completed in 1903 and is dedicated to the memory of Saint Nicholas. The church, built between 1902 and 1903, was designed by the master builder Aleksander Isakson from Vyborg. The facade is plastered and painted to look like red brick, but there is also genuine brick under the plaster. In appearance, it resembles red-brick simultaneous garrison churches. The iconostasis was made at the Alexander Nevsky Lavra in Saint Petersburg and was donated by Nikolay Bobrikov, the Governor-General of Finland. There are eight bells in the cathedral.

The church was consecrated by the second Orthodox Archbishop of Finland, Archbishop  in 1904. The church was renovated in 2003-2004 and reopened by Archbishop Leo Makkonen in 2004. During the renovation, the gilding of the iconostasis was renewed and the interiors of the cathedral were completely renovated.

See also
 Kuopio Cathedral
 St. Nicholas Church, Kotka

Sources

References

External links

 St. Nicholas' Church - Kuopio Orthodox Parish (in Finnish)

Buildings and structures in Kuopio
Finnish Orthodox cathedrals
Tourist attractions in North Savo